Hell on Wheels is the ninth album by heavy metal band Manowar and is also the band's first live album.

Track listing

Disc 1

 "Manowar" (Battle Hymns)
 "Kings of Metal" (Kings of Metal)
 "Kill With Power" (Hail to England)
 "Sign of the Hammer" (Sign of the Hammer)
 "My Spirit Lives On" (Louder Than Hell)
 "Piano Interlude"
 "Courage" (Louder Than Hell)
 "Spirit Horse of the Cherokee" (The Triumph of Steel)
 "Blood of My Enemies" (Hail to England)
 "Hail and Kill" (Kings of Metal)
 "Warriors of the World"

Disc 2
 "Wheels of Fire" (Kings of Metal)
 "Metal Warriors" (The Triumph of Steel)
 "Army of the Immortals" (Hail to England)
 "Black Arrows" (Hail to England)
 "Fighting the World" (Fighting the World)
 "Thor (The Powerhead)" (Sign of the Hammer)
 "King" (Louder Than Hell)
 "The Gods Made Heavy Metal" (Louder Than Hell)
 "Black Wind, Fire and Steel" (Fighting the World)
 "Return of the Warlord" (Louder Than Hell)
 "Carry On" (Fighting the World)
 "Battle Hymn" (Battle Hymns)

Charts

References 

Manowar albums
1997 live albums